Beanstalk may refer to:

 Beanstalk, the stem of a bean plant
 Beanstalk, 1994 film directed by Michael Davis
 AWS Elastic Beanstalk, a part of Amazon's cloud computing platform
 Space elevator, also referred to as a beanstalk

See also
 
 Jack and the Beanstalk (disambiguation)